In Buddhism, symbolic offerings are made to the Triple Gem, giving rise to contemplative gratitude and inspiration.  Typical material offerings involve simple objects such as a lit candle or oil lamp, burning incense, flowers, food, fruit, water or drinks.

Within the traditional Buddhist framework of karma and rebirth, offerings lead to the accumulation of merit, which leads to:
 a better rebirth in the  cycle of birth and death (Pali: vattagamini-kusala)  
 progress towards release from suffering (Pali: vivattagamini-kusala).

These offerings often act as preparation for meditation.

In some traditions, two different types of offerings are identified:
material or hospitality offerings (Pali: amisa-puja or sakkara-puja)
practice offerings (Pali: patipatti-puja)

Material offering

Material offerings are considered external offerings of "words and deeds." Material offerings nurture generosity (Pali:dāna) and virtue (Pali: sīla).  The act further honors the Triple Gem (the Buddha, Dhamma and Sangha), deepening one's commitment to the Buddha's path.

Material offerings might be imbued with the following symbology:
the lighting of a candle or an oil lamp represents the light of wisdom illuminating the darkness of ignorance.
the burning of incense represents the fragrant scent of morality.
flowers represents the aspiration to achieve the body of the Buddha with the thirty-two marks of the Buddha as well as the teaching of impermanence. Alternately, a Zen verse expresses the desire for the mind's "flowers" to "bloom in the springtime of enlightenment."
food, fruit, water, drinks represents the nectar of Dharma and the wish to achieve it.

Traditional chants in Pali, when offering lit candles (padīpa pūjā) and incense (sugandha pūjā) to an image of the Buddha are:

Similarly, a traditional Pali incense-lighting verse speaks of the Buddha's "fragrant body and fragrant face, fragrant with infinite virtues."

By contemplating on an offering, one tangibly sees life's impermanence (Pali: anicca), one of the three characteristics of all things upon which the Buddha encouraged his disciplines to recollect.  For instance, the end of a traditional chant in Pali, when offering flowers (puppha pūjā) to an image of the Buddha is:

In Northern Buddhism, sacred images have set before them:
 water (representing hospitality, to wash the face and feet)
 scarves (Tib. kha-btags, offering friendship)
 flowers, incense, lamps, perfume and food (representing one's devoting all their senses to their spiritual practice).

Non-material offerings

Practice offerings may be manifested by practicing:
 giving (Pali: dāna)
 moral conduct (sīla)
 meditation (samādhi) 
 wisdom (pañña)
In the Pali Canon, the Buddha declared practice offerings (Patipatti) as "the best way of honoring the Buddha" and as the "supreme" offering.  This is primarily an internal offering for mental development (Pali: citta, bhāvanā and samādhi).

"But Ananda, whatever bhikkhu or bhikkhuni, layman or laywoman, abides by the Dhamma, lives uprightly in the Dhamma, walks in the way of the Dhamma, it is by such a one that the Tathagata is respected, venerated, esteemed, worshipped, and honored in the highest degree." (Taken from Mahāparinibbāṇa Sutta, Dīgha Nikāya)

See also 
Buddhānussati
Sacca-kiriya
Learning the Buddha Dhamma
Dana (Buddhism)
Ethical Conduct (Buddhism)
Spiritual Cultivation (Buddhism)
Contemplation (Buddhism)
Meditation (Buddhism)
Chanting (Buddhism)
Devotion (Buddhism)
Householder (Buddhism)

Notes

Bibliography 

Harvey, Peter (1990). An introduction to Buddhism: Teachings, history and practices. Cambridge: Cambridge University. .
Indaratana Maha Thera, Elgiriye (2002). Vandana: The Album of Pali Devotional Chanting and Hymns. Penang, Malaysia:Mahindarama Dhamma Publication. Retrieved 2007-10-22 from "BuddhaNet" at 
Kariyawasam, A.G.S. (1995). Buddhist Ceremonies and Rituals of Sri Lanka (The Wheel Publication No. 402/404). Kandy, Sri Lanka: Buddhist Publication Society. Retrieved 2007-10-23 from "Access to Insight" (1996 transcription) at http://www.accesstoinsight.org/lib/authors/kariyawasam/wheel402.html#ch3.
Kapleau, Philip (1989b). Zen: Merging of East and West. NY:Anchor Book. .
Khantipalo, Bhikkhu (1982). Lay Buddhist Practice: The Shrine Room, Uposatha Day, Rains Residence (The Wheel No. 206/207). Kandy, Sri Lanka:Buddhist Publication Society. Retrieved 2007-10-22 from "Access to Insight" (transcribed 1995) at http://www.accesstoinsight.org/lib/authors/khantipalo/wheel206.html.
Lee Dhammadharo, Ajaan & Thanissaro Bhikkhu (trans.) (1998). Visakha Puja.  Retrieved 2007-10-22 from "Access to Insight" at http://www.accesstoinsight.org/lib/thai/lee/visakha.html.
Nyanaponika Thera (2000). The Vision of Dhamma: Buddhist Writings of Nyanaponika Thera. Seattle: BPS Pariyatti Editions. .
Soni, R.L. & Bhikkhu Khantipalo (2006). Life's Highest Blessings: The Maha Mangala Sutta.  Retrieved 2007-10-22 from "Access to Insight" at http://www.accesstoinsight.org/lib/authors/soni/wheel254.htm.

External links 
About the Buddha-altar Soto Zen home altar with offerings.
The Consecration Ritual
Virtual Puja at Emerald Buddha Temple-วัดพระแก้ว

Buddhist devotion
Religious food and drink